Super Senior (Chinese: 长辈甜心) is a Singaporean family drama produced and telecast on MediaCorp Channel 8. The show aired at 9 pm on weekdays and had a repeat telecast at 8 am the following day. The drama began production in February 2015 and made its run from 18 June to 15 July 2015. It is partly sponsored by the Media Development Authority of Singapore.

Cast

Main cast

Supporting cast

Trivia
Yao Wenlong, Aloysius Pang and Jayley Woo also had scenes together in Tiger Mum.
The series was repeated at 8 am. 
The main characters' surnames are similar to that of the actors that play them, with the exception of Xiang Yun's.
This Series repeated at 5.30pm on weekdays succeeding 'Mind GameThis series repeated at 7am on weekends succeeding Hand In Hand

Controversy
Malaysia's satellite channel Astro Shuang Xing was to air the show first in Asia, beginning from 11 June 2015, Sundays to Thursdays, as with Mind Game (aired on 30 April). When The Journey: Our Homeland aired on 9 July, Our Homeland had to be pulled out temporarily for a week on 16 July due to the discretion of MediaCorp. This caused Taiwan SET's Be With You 2 episodes back-to-back telecast to be pushed forward to 5.00 pm from 16 to 23 July. Our Homeland resumed airing the show on the same day as Singapore from 23 July 2015, Mondays to Fridays. In fact, Astro shouldn't have aired MediaCorp dramas first before Singapore does so beginning with Mind Game, as it did not perform well in Singapore and is also nominated for only one technical award in Star Awards 2016, and that only Super Senior and The Dream Makers II were the only dramas in the planned First Global Premiere to win performance categories.

Awards and nominationsSuper Senior'' is nominated for 4 nominations in 3 award categories, including one technical award and one voting-based award. Chen Shucheng won the Best Evergreen Artiste Award category.

Star Awards 2016

See also
List of programmes broadcast by Mediacorp Channel 8
List of Super Senior episodes

References

Singapore Chinese dramas
2015 Singaporean television series debuts
2015 Singaporean television series endings
Channel 8 (Singapore) original programming